Recea is a commune in Rîșcani District, Moldova. It is composed of three villages: Recea, Slobozia-Recea and Sverdiac.

References

Communes of Rîșcani District